Events in the year 1897 in music.

Specific locations
1897 in Norwegian music

Events 
January 13 – At a memorial concert in Paris for composer Emmanuel Chabrier (died 1894), the first act of his uncompleted work, Briséïs, is performed for the first time.
March 27 – The première of Sergei Rachmaninoff's First Symphony is a complete disaster, leaving many wondering whether Alexander Glazunov, the conductor for the event, was drunk or just disliked the music so much that he did not care about a good performance. It would be three years before Rachmaninoff would compose a major piece of music again.
September 8 – October 8 – Gustav Mahler becomes director of the Vienna Court Opera, and is obliged to convert from Judaism to Roman Catholicism.
The Cakewalk matures into Ragtime music.
John Philip Sousa's band makes phonograph recordings of Cakewalks and early Ragtime.
Early publications by Scott Joplin.
André Messager becomes musical director of the Opéra-Comique.
Ralph Vaughan Williams studies with Max Bruch in Berlin.
Teatro Nuovo in Bergamo changes its name to Teatro Donizetti.
The pan-African anthem "Nkosi Sikelel' iAfrika" ("God Bless Africa") is composed as a Xhosa hymn by South African teacher Enoch Sontonga; versions become the national anthem of 5 countries including Tanzania's "Mungu ibariki Afrika".
Composer Alexander Scriabin marries pianist Vera Ivanovna.

Publications
Ben Harney – Ben Harney's Rag Time Instructor

Published popular music 
 
 "Asleep In The Deep"     w. Arthur J. Lamb m. Henry W. Petrie
 "At A Georgia Camp Meeting"     w.m. Kerry Mills
 "Badinage"     m. Victor Herbert
 "Beautiful Isle of Somewhere"     w. Mrs Jessie Brown Pounds m. John S. Fearis
 "Break The News To Mother"     w.m. Charles K. Harris
 "Danny Deever"     w. Rudyard Kipling m. Walter Damrosch
 "Harlem Rag"     m. Tom Turpin
 "Let 'em All Come"     w.m. T. W. Connor
 "Louisiana Rag" m. Theodore H. Northrup
 "On The Banks Of The Wabash Far Away"     w.m. Paul Dresser
 "Our Lodger's Such A Nice Young Man"     w.m. Fred Murray & Laurence  Barclay
 "Roustabout Rag"     m. Paul Sarebresole
 "The Shuffling Coon" by J. R. Todd
 "Song Of India"     m. Nikolai Rimsky-Korsakov
 "The Stars and Stripes Forever"     m. John Philip Sousa (Recorded on Berliner Records)
 "Syncopated Sandy"  by Ned Wayburn & Stanley Whiting
 "Take Back Your Gold"     w.m. Monroe H. Rosenfeld
 "There's A Little Star Shining For You"     w.m. James Thornton
 "Ye Boston Tea Party" by Arthur Pryor

Recorded popular music 
"A Hot Time in the Old Town"  –  Dan W. Quinn on Berliner Records
"Little Kinkies" (w.m. M. Tobias)  – Edison Concert Band on Edison Records brown wax cylinder No. 155
"My Mother Was a Lady"  –  Dan W. Quinn
"There's a Little Star Shining for You"  –  Dan W. Quinn on Edison Records
"Je suis pocharde!"  – Yvette Guilbert

Classical music
 Hugo Alfvén – Symphony No. 1
 Ferruccio Busoni – Violin Concerto
 Ernest Chausson
 Chant funèbre, for four female voices (1897)
 Piano Quartet in A, Op. 30
 Vêpres pour le commun des vierges, for organ, Op. 31
 String Quartet, Op. 35
 Piece for cello or viola, and piano, Op. 39
Frederick Delius – Piano Concerto
 Felix Draeseke – String Quintet in A "Stelzner"-Quintet
 Paul Dukas – The Sorcerer's Apprentice
 George Enescu –
Piano Suite No. 1 in G minor, "Dans le style ancien" Op. 3
Poème roumain, Op. 1
Sonata no. 1 for violin and piano in D major, Op. 2
Trio in G minor for piano, violin, and cello
 August Enna – Concerto for violin and orchestra in D major
 Asger Hamerik – Symphony no. 6 ("Spirituelle") for string orchestra
 Alexander Mackenzie – Piano Concerto
 Carl Nielsen – Hymnus amoris
 Dora Pejačević – Berceuse, Op. 2, for solo piano
 Nikolai Rimsky-Korsakov – Symphony No. 2 "Antar" (final version)
 Arnold Schoenberg – String Quartet in D major
 Alexander Scriabin – Piano Sonata No. 2
 Richard Strauss –  Till Eulenspiegels lustige Streiche
 Alexander von Zemlinsky – Symphony No. 2

Opera
Frederick Delius – Koanga
August Enna – The Little Match Girl
Zdeněk Fibich – Šárka
Eduard Holst – Our Flats, premiered in New York
Wilhelm Kienzl – Don Quixote
Luigi Mancinelli – Ero e Leandro
Jules Massenet – Sapho
 Johann Strauss II – Die Göttin der Vernunft
Alexander Zemlinsky – Sarema

Musical theater
 The Belle of New York      Broadway production
 The Charlatan     Broadway production
 The Circus Girl     Broadway production
 The Glad Hand     Broadway production
 Pousse Café     Broadway production
 The Yashmak – Adaptation of an Armenian operetta, Leblébidji Horhor, with music by Napoleon Lambelet and libretto by Cecil Raleigh and Seymour Hicks, runs from 31 March 1897 to 31 July 1897 (121 performances) at the Shaftesbury Theatre, London.

Births 
January 2 – Jane Green, US singer (died 1931)
January 9 – Luis Gianneo, Argentine composer, pianist, and conductor (died 1968)
January 10 – Sam Chatmon, blues musician (died 1983)
January 22
Rosa Ponselle, soprano (died 1981)
Leslie Sarony, English singer, comedian and songwriter (died 1985)
February 12 – Břetislav Bakala, conductor and pianist (died 1958)
February 27 – Marian Anderson, contralto (died 1993)
March 3 – Ingrid Lang-Fagerström, harpist (died 1990)
March 6 – Sandy MacPherson, theatre organist (died 1975)
March 9 – Pedro Flores, composer (died 1979)
March 11 – Henry Cowell, composer (died 1965)
March 13 – Maria Nemeth, Hungarian operatic soprano (died 1967)
March 26 – David McCallum, Sr., violinist and father of David McCallum (died 1972)
April 1 – Lucille Bogan, blues singer (died 1979)
April 8 – John Frederick Coots, US composer (died 1985)
April 17 – Harald Sæverud, composer (died 1992)
April 19 – Vivienne Segal, US actress and singer (died 1992)
April 23 – Pixinguinha, choro composer and woodwind player (died 1973)
May 14 – Sidney Bechet, jazz saxophonist, clarinetist, and composer (died 1959)
May 29 – Erich Wolfgang Korngold, composer (died 1957)
June 3 
Memphis Minnie, blues singer (died 1973)
Boris Kroyt, classical violinist and violist, member of the Budapest String Quartet from 1936 to 1967 (died 1969)
June 12 – Alexandre Tansman, pianist and composer (died 1986)
June 15 – Mary Ellis, actress and singer (died 2003)
June 22 – Bulbul, opera and folk singer (died 1961)
July 11 – Blind Lemon Jefferson, blues musician (died 1929)
June 27 – Maceo Pinkard, composer, lyricist and music publisher (died 1962)
August 10 — Jack Haley, American actor (d. 1979)
August 4 – Abe Lyman, US bandleader, composer and drummer (died 1957)
August 29 – Helge Rosvaenge, operatic tenor (died 1972)
September 3 – Francisco Mignone, composer (died 1986)
September 8 – Jimmie Rodgers, country singer (died 1933)
September 18
Pablo Sorozábal, composer (died 1988)
Sam H. Stept, Russian-born US composer, pianist and conductor (died 1964)
October 11 – Leo Reisman, violinist and bandleader (died 1961)
October 26 – Tiana Lemnitz, operatic soprano (died 1994)
November 2 – Dennis King, British singer and actor (died 1971)
November 12 – Karl Marx, conductor and composer (died 1985)
November 20 – Margaret Sutherland, composer (died 1984)
November 25 – Willie 'The Lion' Smith, US jazz pianist (died 1973)
December 9 – Hermione Gingold, actress and singer (died 1987)
December 18 – Fletcher Henderson, jazz musician (died 1952)
December 26 — Wilhelmina Schmidt, singer and composer; stage name Willy Corsari (died 1998)
December 30  – Alfredo Bracchi, Italian lyricist (died 1976)
date unknown – Aileen Stanley, singer (died 1982)

Deaths 
January 24 – Sarah Edith Wynne, operatic soprano and concert singer, 54
February 10 – Antonio Bazzini, violinist, composer and music, 78
February 23 – Woldemar Bargiel, composer and teacher, 68
February 25 – Cornélie Falcon, opera singer, 83
March 7 – Leonard Labatt, operatic tenor, 58
April 3 – Johannes Brahms, composer, 63
April 8 – George Garrett, composer, 62
April 23 – Clement Harris, pianist and composer, 25 (killed in the Greco-Turkish war)
May 21 – Carl Mikuli, pianist and composer, 77
June 9
Ignace Gibsone, pianist and composer, 70
Pavel Pabst, pianist and composer, 43
June 18 – Franz Krenn, composer and music teacher, 81
August 1 – Gaetano Antoniazzi, violin-maker, 71
September 16 – Edward Edwards, choirmaster and composer, 81
September 20
Karel Bendl, composer, 59
Grenville Dean Wilson, pianist and composer, 64
October 11 – Léon Boëllmann, organist and composer, 35
November 6 – Edouard Deldevez, conductor, composer and violinist, 80
November 14  – Giuseppina Strepponi, operatic soprano, 82
December – Slavka Atanasijević, Serbian pianist and composer, 47
December 4 – Adolf Neuendorff, German-American composer, conductor, pianist and violinist, 54

References

 
1890s in music
19th century in music
Music by year